Andrzej Pieczyński (born 17 December 1956) is a Polish actor. In 2003 he starred in the film An Ancient Tale: When the Sun Was a God under Jerzy Hoffman.

He is an ex-husband of actress Małgorzata Pieczyńska.

References

External links

Polish male film actors
Polish male stage actors
People from Pobiedziska
1956 births
Living people
Polish male television actors
Polish theatre directors